The Billboard Latin Music Awards grew out of the Billboard Music Awards program from Billboard magazine, an industry publication charting the sales and radio airplay success of musical recordings. The Billboard awards are the Latin music industry’s longest running award. The award ceremonies are held during the same week as Latinfest+ (formerly known as the Billboard Latin Music Conference). The first award ceremony began in 1994. In addition to awards given on the basis of success on the Billboard charts, the ceremony includes the Spirit of Hope award for humanitarian achievements and the Lifetime Achievement award, as well as awards by the broadcasting partner. Musician Enrique Iglesias has won 47 awards, the colombian Shakira has won 42 awards, and is the most awarded female. The Billboard Latin Music includes entrants from the United States, Latin America, and Spain, although other countries are eligible if an artist performs Latin music.

Since 1999, the awards ceremony has been broadcast on the television network Telemundo, where it became the network's highest-rated music special. The ceremony is broadcast throughout the Americas and Puerto Rico. Billboard also presents three special awards during the ceremony: the "Spirit of Hope" for artists who have dedicated their career to philanthropy, the Lifetime Achievement Award to recognize an artist's career in the Latin music industry, and occasionally the Latin Music Hall of Fame to honor a musical personality who has largely contributed to the Latin music genre.

Ceremonies

See also
Billboard Music Awards

Notes

References

External links
 Official site
 Telemundo Official Show Site

 
Telemundo original programming
Latin music awards
Awards established in 1994
Hispanic American music
1994 establishments in the United States